Daphne Joyce Maynard (born November 5, 1953) is an American novelist and journalist. She began her career in journalism in the 1970s, writing for several publications, most notably Seventeen magazine and The New York Times. Maynard contributed to Mademoiselle and Harrowsmith magazines in the 1980s, while also beginning a career as a novelist with the publication of her first novel, Baby Love (1981). Her second novel, To Die For (1992), drew from the Pamela Smart murder case and was adapted into the 1995 film of the same name. Maynard received significant media attention in 1998 with the publication of her memoir At Home in the World, which deals with her affair with J. D. Salinger.

Maynard has published novels in a wide range of literary genres, including fiction, young adult fiction, and true crime. Her sixth novel, Labor Day (2009), was adapted into the 2013 film of the same name, directed by Jason Reitman. Her most recent novels include The Good Daughters (2010), After Her (2013), Under the Influence (2016), and Count the Ways (2021).

Early life
Maynard was born in Durham, New Hampshire, the daughter of Fredelle (née Bruser), a journalist, writer, and English teacher, and Max Maynard, a painter and professor of English at the University of New Hampshire (and brother of theologian Theodore Maynard). Her father was born in India to English missionary parents and later moved to Canada; her mother was born in Saskatchewan to Jewish immigrants from Russia.

Maynard attended the Oyster River school district and Phillips Exeter Academy. She won Scholastic Art and Writing Awards in 1966, 1967, 1968, 1970, and 1971. In her teens, she wrote regularly for Seventeen magazine. She entered Yale University in 1971 and sent a collection of her writings to the editors of The New York Times Magazine. They asked her to write an article about growing up in the 1960s, which was published under the title "An 18-Year-Old Looks Back on Life" in the magazine's April 23, 1972 issue. After the article was published, Maynard received  a letter from fiction writer J. D. Salinger, then 53 years old, who complimented her writing and warned her of the dangers of publicity.

Relationship with Salinger and At Home in the World
Maynard and Salinger exchanged letters. After her freshman year at Yale, she moved into his house in Cornish, New Hampshire. Salinger and his wife had divorced in 1967. While living with him for eight months, mid-1972 until March 1973, Maynard wrote her first book, a memoir titled Looking Back: A Chronicle of Growing Up Old in the Sixties, which was published in 1973 soon after Maynard and Salinger ended their relationship.

Maynard withheld information about their relationship until her 1998 memoir At Home in the World. The memoir, which accounts for her entire life up to that point, is best known for its in-depth retelling of her relationship with Salinger, whom she portrays as a predator. At its publication, many reviewers furiously panned the book, such as Jonathan Yardley from the Washington Post, who called it “indescribably stupid.” 

During the same year, she auctioned the letters that Salinger had written to her. Software developer Peter Norton bought the letters for $156,500 and returned them to Salinger.

In 2021, Maynard would write on the relationship in Vanity Fair relating to Allen v. Farrow, stating that “I was groomed to be the sexual partner of a narcissist who nearly derailed my life,” going into detail on the other relations with teenagers Salinger had at the same time, and "[w]hen he sent me away less than a year later with words of contempt and disdain, I believed the failure was mine, and that I was no longer worthy of his love or even respect." With regards to the reception of her memoirs, she notes the negative reception, adding “I was accused of trying to sell books, to make money from my brief and inconsequential connection to a great man,” noting "[O]ne writer, Cynthia Ozick—hardly alone among celebrated authors, weighing in with her condemnation—portrayed me as a person who, in possession of no talent of my own, had attached myself to Salinger to 'suck out' his celebrity."

Journalism
After moving out of Salinger's house in 1973, Maynard bought a house in Hillsborough, New Hampshire. From 1973 to 1975, she contributed commentaries to a series called Spectrum on CBS Radio. In 1975, she joined the staff of The New York Times as a general assignment reporter and feature writer. She left The New York Times in 1977, when she married Steve Bethel. They moved to New Hampshire and had three children, Audrey, Charlie, and Wilson.

From 1984 to 1990, Maynard wrote the weekly syndicated column “Domestic Affairs,” dealing with marriage, parenthood, and family life. She worked as book reviewer and columnist for Mademoiselle and Harrowsmith magazines. In 1986 she helped lead the opposition to the construction of the nation's first high-level nuclear waste dump in her home state of New Hampshire, a campaign she described in a New York Times cover story in April 1986.

After her divorce from Bethel in 1989, she and her children moved to Keene, New Hampshire.

Fiction 
Maynard published her first novel, Baby Love, in 1981. Her 1992 novel To Die For drew from the Pamela Smart murder case and was adapted into the 1995 film of the same name, directed by Gus Van Sant and starring Nicole Kidman, Matt Dillon, and Joaquin Phoenix. In the late 1990s, she wrote to her readers in an online discussion forum, The Domestic Affairs Message Board.

She published two books of young adult fiction: The Usual Rules (2003) and The Cloud Chamber (2005). Her true crime book, Internal Combustion (2006), dealt with the case of Nancy Seaman, a Michigan resident who was convicted of killing her husband in 2004. The novel Labor Day was published in 2009 and turned into a movie of the same name, written and directed by Jason Reitman. Her other novels include The Good Daughters (2010), After Her (2013), and Under the Influence (2016).

Personal life 
She married Steve Bethel in 1977 and divorced him in 1989. They had three children together; daughter Audrey and sons Charlie and Wilson.

Maynard and her sister Rona, a writer and retired editor of Chatelaine magazine, collaborated on an examination of their sisterhood. Rona Maynard's memoir My Mother's Daughter was published in the fall of 2007.

In February 2010, Maynard adopted two Ethiopian girls. In spring 2011, she told friends and family she could no longer care for the girls. She sent them to live with a family in Wyoming and, citing their privacy, removed all references to them from her website.

On July 6, 2013, she married lawyer Jim Barringer. He died on June 16, 2016, of pancreatic cancer. Their relationship and his death was the subject of her 2017 memoir The Best of Us.

Maynard returned to Yale as a sophomore in 2018 to complete her undergraduate education.

Selected works

Fiction
 Baby Love (1981)
 To Die For (1992)
 Where Love Goes (1995)
 The Usual Rules (2003)
 The Cloud Chamber (2005)
 Labor Day (2009)
  The Good Daughters (2010)
 After Her (2013)
 Under the Influence (2016)
 Count the Ways (2021)
 The Influencers (2022)
 The Bird Hotel (2023)
 How The Light Gets In (2024)

Nonfiction
 Looking Back: A Chronicle of Growing Up Old in the Sixties (1973)
 Domestic Affairs: Enduring the Pleasures of Motherhood and Family Life (1987)
 At Home in the World (1998)
 Internal Combustion: A Story of a Marriage and a Murder in the Motor City (2006)
 "A Good Girl Goes Bad" (2007), in Bad Girls: 26 Writers Misbehave, edited by Ellen Sussman
 "Your Friend Always" (2007), in Mr. Wrong: Real-Life Stories About the Men We Used to Love, edited by Harriet Brown
 "Someone Like Me, But Younger" (2009), in The Face in the Mirror: Writers Reflect on Their Dreams of Youth and the Reality of Age, edited by Victoria Zackheim
 "Straw into Gold" (2013), in Knitting Yarns: Writers on Knitting, edited by Ann Hood (W. W. Norton & Company)
The Best of Us (2017)

References

External links
 "Why Does the American Press Hate Joyce Maynard?" by Jules Siegel (Book Arts)

1953 births
20th-century American non-fiction writers
20th-century American novelists
20th-century American women writers
21st-century American non-fiction writers
21st-century American novelists
21st-century American women writers
American memoirists
American people of Canadian descent
American people of English descent
American people of Russian-Jewish descent
American women novelists
Jewish American novelists
Living people
Novelists from New Hampshire
People from Durham, New Hampshire
Phillips Exeter Academy alumni
American women memoirists
Writers from New Hampshire
Yale University alumni
Women crime writers